Chrysis elegans is a species of cuckoo wasps (i.e. insects in the family Chrysididae) found in Southern Europe.

References

External links 

 Chrysis elegans at chrysis.net (retrieved 9 July 2016)
 Chrysis elegans at Biolib (retrieved 9 July 2016)

Chrysidinae
Insects described in 1806
Hymenoptera of Europe
Taxa named by Amédée Louis Michel le Peletier